Greyspace (product code SJR6) is an accessory for the Spelljammer campaign setting for the Dungeons & Dragons fantasy role-playing game.

Contents
This 96-page booklet describes the area of space near the planet Oerth of the Greyhawk setting. The book describes the planets and sites of Oerth, Kule, Raenei, Liga, The Grinder, Edill, Gnibile, Conatha, Ginsel, Borka, Greela, and The Spectre. The book also details new magical items and new monsters.

Publication history
The book was written by Nigel Findley, and was published in 1992. Cover art is by Tom Baxa, with interior illustrations by David O. Miller, and cartography by John Knecht.

Reception

References

Role-playing game supplements introduced in 1992
Spelljammer supplements